The Vesperidae are a small family of beetles, normally classified within the family Cerambycidae, of heterogeneous aspect but all characterised by larval stages related to roots of herbaceous plants or trees

Morphology

Adult
The nocturnal adults are characterised  by earthy brown-testaceous colours, brachypterous  wings or apterous (especially in females) and physogastry in females. Some tropical genera (Pathocerus) have comb-like antennae, some other (Hypocephalus) extremely reduced antennae. Some genera, such as the Brazilian  Migdolus have well-developed mandibles, such as the males of the cerambycids Parandra and Spondylis, while others, such as the males of the genus Hypocephalus, have extremely modified mandibles.

Larva
The larvae have evolved some adaptations to subterranean life. In particular, the Mediterranean genus Vesperus have larvae characterised by a peculiar larval hypermetamorphosis. The larvae I have a normal worm-like aspect (though characterised by abnormally long setae), while those of following stadia have a C-shaped aspect, which makes them similar to the larvae of Melolonthinae.

Systematics
The family includes 3 subfamilies:
 Anoplodermatinae Guérin-Méneville, 1840 
 Philinae J.Thomson, 1860 
 Vesperinae Mulsant, 1839

In the past, the Vesperini has been placed within Lepturinae, the Anoplodermatini within Prioninae and the Philini a mysterious group related to the Prioninae. Some peculiar larval characteristics of Vesperus has prompted some authorities to separate them as a subfamily and later as a distinct family.In 1997 Švácha, Wang & Chen recognised the morphological similarities among these three groups in the larval stadia. More recently, analyses on chromosomes has also evidenced strong differences with respect to Cerambycidae.

References

External links
Gallery of world-wide Vesperidae
Gallery of Anoplodermatinae

 
Beetle families